Andrei Vasile Muntean (born 30 January 1993) is a Romanian male artistic gymnast and a member of the national team. He won gold medals on the parallel bars at the 2002 European Junior Championships and on the rings at the 2010 Summer Youth Olympics. Since his senior debut in 2011, Muntean appeared in every edition of the World Championships, and was eventually selected to compete, alongside his fellow gymnasts Marian Drăgulescu and Catalina Ponor, for the Romanian squad at the 2016 Summer Olympics in Rio de Janeiro.

References

External links 

 
 
 
 

1993 births
Living people
Romanian male artistic gymnasts
Sportspeople from Sibiu
Gymnasts at the 2010 Summer Youth Olympics
Gymnasts at the 2016 Summer Olympics
Olympic gymnasts of Romania
Universiade medalists in gymnastics
Universiade bronze medalists for Romania
Medalists at the 2017 Summer Universiade